Francis Dunn may refer to:
Francis Dunn (American football) (1891–1975), American football player and coach
Francis G. Dunn (fl. 1937–1985), Justice of the South Dakota Supreme Court
Francis J. Dunn (fl. 1841), Wisconsin politician
Francis John Dunn (1922–1989), bishop in the Catholic Church in the United States